Andrew A. Snelling is a young-Earth creationist geologist who works for Answers in Genesis.

Education and career
Snelling has a Ph.D. in geology from the University of Sydney from 1982.

He was, for a decade, the geology spokesman for the Creation Science Foundation, the coordinating center for creationism in Australia.  He started working for Answers in Genesis in 2007 and serves as AiG's director of research.
 
Snelling has been published in standard geological publications estimating the age of geological specimens in billions of years, but has also written articles for creationist journals in which he supports a young-earth creationism viewpoint. He worked in the RATE project.

Snelling appeared in the 2017 creationist documentary film Is Genesis History?

Discrimination allegation lawsuit
Snelling, like other young-Earth creationists, believes the Grand Canyon formed after the Biblical flood;  the rocks in Grand Canyon were formed billions of years ago and the Grand Canyon itself was formed millions of years ago.  In 2013 Snelling applied for a permit to collect 50-60 half-pound rocks from the park. The application was denied because the National Park Service screens applications to take material from the Grand Canyon, to protect it.  One of the three geologists who reviewed the proposal for the National Park Service stated that the type of rock Snelling was trying to test could be found outside the park, and all three reviewers made it clear they did not consider the proposal scientifically valid.

Snelling submitted a revised proposal in 2016.  In a letter dated May 5, 2017, the NPS said it found the application acceptable and it was willing to grant it if changes were made to locations and methods of collecting rocks; Snelling proposed to chisel away rocks and to do so from highly visible rock faces, to take samples from land that was not parkland but rather was on an Indian reservation and also from another location that was likely to have archeological remains.  The NPS had authorized a river trip for Snelling to survey locations but not to collect specimens; Snelling objected that this would take too much time and expense, and in response in the May 5 letter, the NPS offered to have staff work with Snelling to map locations in a meeting or conference call.

On May 9, 2017, Snelling, with the help of the Alliance Defending Freedom, filed a religious discrimination lawsuit against the United States Department of the Interior and the Grand Canyon National Park authorities, citing the Trump administration's executive order of May 4, 2017 about religious liberty. In late June 2017 Answers in Genesis released a statement saying the National Park authorities had issued Snelling a permit to collect rock samples, and that Snelling had withdrawn the lawsuit. Snelling's attorneys did not provide a copy of the permit to a reporter from the Phoenix New Times who requested it.

Publications

Books

In creationist journals

In scientific Journals

References

External links
Biography at Answers in Genesis

Australian geologists
Living people
University of Sydney alumni
Christian Young Earth creationists
Year of birth missing (living people)